The 1779 Vermont Republic gubernatorial election took place throughout September, and resulted in the re-election of Thomas Chittenden to a one-year term.

The Vermont General Assembly met in Manchester on October 14. The Vermont House of Representatives appointed a committee to examine the votes of the freemen of Vermont for governor, lieutenant governor, treasurer, and governor's council members. Thomas Chittenden was re-elected governor. Benjamin Carpenter was elected lieutenant governor, and Ira Allen was re-elected as treasurer. The names of candidates and balloting totals were not recorded.

Results

References

Vermont gubernatorial elections
1779 in Vermont
1779 elections in North America